On the Divide is a 1928 American silent Western film directed by J.P. McGowan and starring Bob Custer, Peggy Montgomery and Lafe McKee.

Cast
 Bob Custer as Jim Carson 
 Peggy Montgomery as Sally Martin 
 Lafe McKee
 Bud Osborne
 J.P. McGowan

References

Bibliography
 John J. McGowan. J.P. McGowan: Biography of a Hollywood Pioneer. McFarland, 2005.

External links
 

1928 films
1928 Western (genre) films
Films directed by J. P. McGowan
American black-and-white films
Silent American Western (genre) films
1920s English-language films
1920s American films